Klara Zarmairovna Ashrafyan (15 September 1924, Yerevan — 7 August 1999, Moscow) was a Soviet Indologist of Armenian origin. She was known for her researches into the Delhi Sultanate and the Mughal Empire.

Life and career
Klara Ashrafyan was born in Yerevan in the family of one of the founders of the Armenian Communist party, Zarmair Ashrafyan. In 1936, he and his wife were denounced, arrested and executed. The orphaned Klara was adopted by relatives in Moscow. Despite being tarnished as a family member of traitors to the Motherland, she was allowed to study at the Faculty of History, Moscow State University, where she graduated in 1947. She specialised in the history of medieval Iran under B.N. Zakhoder, obtaining her Candidate of Sciences degree in 1950 with a dissertation on the period of the rule of Nadir Shah.

Between 1950 and 1955, she worked as an editor of the bulletin of foreign literature at the Fundamental Library of Social Sciences, succeeding Koka Antonova. Persuaded by Antonova and I.M. Reisner to change her field of study, she shifted to researching the Islamic states of medieval India, where her knowledge of Persian was useful. From 1955 to her death, she worked at the Institute of Oriental Studies of the Russian Academy of Sciences.

In 1984, the Institute decided to organise a multi-volume collective set of works on the History of the Orient. Ashrafyan was tasked with heading a section on the peoples of the east. She edited volumes II and III of the set.

Ashrafyan died in Moscow on 7 August 1999.

Academics
Ashrafyan's first monograph, published in 1960, was titled The Delhi Sultanate, covering the political development and social and economic basis for the first Islamic dominions in North India. This was the first publication on the subject in the Soviet Union.

Her investigations were chiefly into land ownership and the socio-economic structure of Indo-Muslim states. In keeping with Soviet philosophies of progressive evolution of the economy, she termed private land holdings in the 13th century as feudal tenure, replaced subsequently by the military organisation of the ruling class, leading to state ownership of land and the economic subjugation of the peasantry. She claimed that private ownership evolved slowly in India with the coercion of producers, such that before the British occupation of the country, prerequisites for production relations were already being established in the agricultural system of the country. Whereas some scholars claimed that the rise and fall of dominions in India were essentially manifestations of a static socio-economic structure, with state power changing hands and not facing any social conflicts or subaltern revolts, Ashrafyan contended that by the late medieval period, there were peasant uprisings against Mughal rule, chiefly caused by wealthy agriculturalists wanting a larger share of the revenue and power. Indeed, she posited two stages of feudalism, an early phase up to the 13th century and a developed phase up to the 18th. In the former, a hierarchical organisation of class established itself, with the peasantry and merchant class subjugated and a new elite lording over them. In the latter, popular movements churned society, upending the hierarchy to a degree. Still, she said, feudalism didn't evolve sufficiently towards the capitalist stage of development. This thesis was criticised as dubious, especially for the pan-Indian nature of the argument, whereas other researchers had shown that in the South, taxpayers were not necessarily peasants and in any case owned property.

In her analysis of the change of socio-economic structures, Ashrafyan (in keeping with the Soviet school of Indian studies) took an anti-religious stance, suggesting that movements such as Bhakti and Sikhism diluted social reform with religious garb, and that Akbar's Din-i Ilahi was a state counter to reduce their energy.

Selected works

References

Bibliography
 
 
 
 

Writers from Yerevan
1924 births
1999 deaths
Soviet historians
Moscow State University alumni
Soviet orientalists
Soviet Armenians
Soviet women writers